Vladimir Aleksandrovich Bobylev (born 18 April 1997) is a Russian professional ice hockey forward who is currently playing with HC Lada Togliatti of the Supreme Hockey League (VHL). He was selected by the Toronto Maple Leafs, 122nd overall, in 2016 NHL Entry Draft.

Playing career
Bobylev made his professional debut in the 2016–17 season, returning to Russia and playing 20 games with HC Spartak Moscow in the Kontinental Hockey League (KHL). After recording just 3 points with Spartak, Bobylev opted for an immediate release with the club in order to continue his development in North America, returning to former junior club the Victoria Royals of the Western Hockey League on December 9, 2016.

Bobylev attended the Maple Leafs 2017 training camp the following summer before he was reassigned to AHL affiliate, the Toronto Marlies, in order to partake in another training camp. He returned to Russia at the conclusion of the Marlies training camp, joining Salavat Yulaev Ufa in a trade from Spartak and signing a three-year contract to begin the 2017–18 season.

Bobylev spent parts of three seasons within the Traktor Chelyabinsk organization, before returning to original club, Spartak Moscow on 25 June 2021. After attending Spartak's pre-season training camp, Bobylev was then traded to continue in the VHL with Lada Togliatti on 23 August 2021.

Career statistics

References

External links
 

1997 births
Living people
HC Spartak Moscow players
Russian ice hockey right wingers
Salavat Yulaev Ufa players
Sportspeople from Lipetsk
Toronto Maple Leafs draft picks
Toros Neftekamsk players
Vancouver Giants players
Victoria Royals players